The 2015 Tevlin Women's Challenger was a professional tennis tournament played on indoor hard courts. It was the 11th edition of the tournament and part of the 2015 ITF Women's Circuit, offering a total of $50,000 in prize money. It took place in Toronto, Ontario, Canada between October 26 and November 1, 2015.

Singles main-draw entrants

Seeds

1 Rankings are as of October 19, 2015

Other entrants
The following players received wildcards into the singles main draw:
 Bianca Andreescu
 Charlotte Robillard-Millette
 Fanni Stollár
 Carol Zhao

The following players received entry from the qualifying draw:
 Isabelle Boulais
 Ulrikke Eikeri
 Mari Osaka
 Eva Wacanno

The following player received entry as a lucky loser:
  Karman Kaur Thandi

Champions

Singles

 Tatjana Maria def.  Jovana Jakšić, 6–3, 6–2

Doubles

 Sharon Fichman /  Maria Sanchez def.  Kristie Ahn /  Fanny Stollár, 6–2, 6–7(6–8), [10–6]

External links
Official website

Tevlin Women's Challenger
Tevlin Women's Challenger
Tevlin Women's Challenger